The GR 71 is a long-distance walking route of the Grande Randonnée network in France. The route connects L'Espérou with Mazamet.

Along the way, the route passes through:
 L'Espérou
 La Couvertoirade
 Soubès
 Lodève
 Cambon-et-Salvergues
 Fraisse-sur-Agout
 Mazamet

References

Hiking trails in France